Təklə (formerly Leninabad) is a village and municipality in the Gobustan Rayon of Azerbaijan.  It has a population of 1,782.

References 

Populated places in Gobustan District